Predrag Živadinović (Serbian Cyrillic: Пpeдpaг Живaдинoвић; born 7 July 1983) is a Serbian football striker, currently playing for FK Sušica Kragujevac.

Honours
Mladost Lučani
Serbian First League: 2013–14

External sources
 Profile at Srbijafudbal.

1983 births
Living people
Sportspeople from Kragujevac
Serbian footballers
FK Bashkimi players
Expatriate footballers in North Macedonia
FK BSK Borča players
Serbian First League players
Serbian SuperLiga players
FK Radnički 1923 players
FK Metalac Gornji Milanovac players
FK Mladost Lučani players
FK Šumadija 1903 players
Association football forwards